Gilda is a 1946 film noir starring Rita Hayworth as the title character.

Gilda may also refer to:

People with name

Stagename or alias
Gilda (Argentine singer) (1961-1996), Argentine singer and songwriter born Miriam Alejandra Bianchi
Gilda (Italian singer) (born 1950), Italian singer, winner of the 1975 Sanremo Music Festival
Gilda Jovine, modelling name of Gilda Gross (born 1981), Dominican beauty pageant titleholder, actress and model
Gilda Mignonette, stage name of Griselda Andreatini, (1890–1953), Neapolitan singer

Given name
Gilda Aranda (born 1933), Mexican former Olympic sports swimmer
Gilda Barabino (born 1956), American academic
Gilda Bolt-González, (born 1956), Nicaraguan diplomat
Gilda Buttà, (born 1959), Italian pianist
Gilda Casanova, (born 1995), Cuban sprinter
Gilda Cobb-Hunter, (born 1952), American politician
Gilda Cordero-Fernando, (1930-2020), Filipino writer and publisher
Gilda Cruz-Romo, (born 1940), Mexican operatic soprano
Gilda Dalla Rizza, (1892-1975), Italian operatic soprano
Gilda Darthy, (1878–1952), French actress
Gilda de Abreu, (1904–1979), Brazilian actress, singer, writer and film director
Gilda Galán, (1917-2009), Puerto Rican actress, dramatist, comedian, writer, composer, scriptwriter and poet
Gilda García, (born c. 1965) full name Gilda García López, Panamanian beauty pageant contestant, winner of the Miss Panamá 1986 title
Gilda Gelati, (born 1967), Italian ballerina
Gilda Giuliani, (born 1954), Italian singer 
Gilda Gray, (1901–1959) Polish-born American actress and dancer, born Marianna Michalska 
Gilda Haddock, (born 1956), Puerto Rican actress, gospel singer and dancer
Gilda Holst, (born 1952), Ecuadorian writer and professor
Gilda Jacobs, (born 1949), American politician
Gilda Jannaccone, (born 1940), Italian former middle distance runner
Gilda Kirkpatrick, (born 1973), Iranian-born New Zealand author, creative director and television personality
Gilda Langer, (1896–1920), German actress
Gilda Lousek, (1937–1998), Argentine actress
Gilda H. Loew, (1930–2001), American chemist
Gilda Lyons, (born 1975), American composer, vocalist, and visual artist
Gilda Maiken, (1922-2001), American pop and jazz singer
Gilda Marchiò, (1884–1954), Italian theatre actress
Gilda Montenegro, (born 1967), Costa Rican slalom canoeist
Gilda E. Nardone, (?), American women's employment advocate
Gilda Ochoa, (?), American sociologist and professor
Gilda Oliveira, (born 1983), Brazilian freestyle wrestler
Gilda Oliveros, (born 1949), former American politician
Gilda Olvidado, (born 1957), Filipina movie and television writer
Gilda O'Neill, (1951–2010), British novelist and historian
Gilda Radner, (1946-1989), American comedian and actress
Gilda Ruta, (1856–1932), Italian pianist, music educator and composer
Gilda Sansone, (born 1989), Italian fashion model
Gilda Snowden, (1954–2014), African-American artist from Detroit
Gilda Texter, (born 1946), American costume designer, wardrobe supervisor and actress
Gilda Varesi, (1887–1965), also known as Gilda Varesi Archibald, Italian-born actress and playwright

Fictional characters
Gilda, the daughter of the title character of the opera Rigoletto
Gilda Dent, the wife of Harvey Dent (better known as the villain Two-Face) in Batman comic books 
Gilda the Griffon, a character in My Little Pony: Friendship is Magic
Gilda Joyce, mystery novel series written by Jennifer Allison, featuring lead character Gilda Joyce as a psychic investigator
Las hermanas Gilda, Spanish comic characters of the series of the same name created by Manuel Vázquez Gallego in 1949

Other uses
Tropical Storm Gilda (disambiguation), the name of various cyclones
Gilda's Italian Restaurant, family-owned Italian restaurant in Portland, Oregon
I'm Gilda, (Spanish: Gilda, no me arrepiento de este amor), Argentine biographical drama film about the life of singer and songwriter Gilda
Scandalous Gilda, 1985 Italian erotic drama film
The Gilda Stories, 1991 novel by American author Jewelle Gomez
Yo soy Gilda: amar es un milagro, upcoming Netflix biographical series based on the life of Argentinian singer Gilda
Gilda's Club, community organization for people with cancer
Friends of Gilda, 1993 ninety-minute television special fundraiser
Love, Gilda, 2018 American-Canadian documentary film
Gilda Live, 1980 American comedy documentary